Sim Sajeong (1707 - 1769), was a representative painter in the literati artist's style along with Jeong Seon in 18th Joseon period. He learned to paint from Jeong Seon, so he was influenced by his teacher. He was good at almost all genres of painting such as muninhwa (문인화, painting in the literati style), sansuhwa (산수화, landscape painting), yeongmohwa (영모화, animal-and-bird painting), inmulhwa (figure painting).

See also
Korean painting
List of Korean painters
Korean art
Korean culture

External links

Brief biography and gallery (in Korean)

1707 births
1769 deaths
18th-century Korean painters